Jay Manuel (born August 14, 1972) is a Canadian TV host, Creative Director, make-up artist, and author. He is most recognizable as the Creative Director on the popular reality television show America's Next Top Model for the first eighteen seasons. Manuel also was featured as the host of Canada's Next Top Model.

Manuel is the Founder and CEO of the beauty line, Jay Manuel Beauty. In 2017, the brand opened its first retail location at Roosevelt Field Mall. Later that year, he was one of the judges for Miss Universe 2017. In 2020, he released his first book, The Wig, The Bitch & The Meltdown.

Early life
Manuel was born in Springfield, Illinois to a mother of Italian and Czech descent and a South African father of mixed Cape Malay descent. He was raised by adoptive parents in Toronto where he attended Dr Norman Bethune Collegiate Institute and York University. Before entering the fashion industry, Manuel was a pre-med student and also studied opera.

Career
He has worked in "the business of managing to aesthetic" for seven years. He has worked as a makeup artist and stylist for Vogue, Harper's Bazaar, Marie Claire, Victoria's Secret, Revlon, and CoverGirl. Manuel has also worked with noted fashion photographers such as Herb Ritts, Richard Avedon, Annie Leibovitz, and Francesco Scavullo. He has been a makeup artist and stylist to celebrities such as Tyra Banks, Naomi Campbell, Iman, Alicia Silverstone, Rebecca Romijn, Rupert Everett, Bridget Moynahan, Angela Bassett, Jada Pinkett Smith, Mýa, Kim Cattrall, Natalie Cole, Toni Braxton, Garcelle Beauvais-Nilon, Vanessa Williams, Patti LaBelle, Rosario Dawson, Pink, David Bowie, and Jennifer Lopez.

Manuel joined America's Next Top Model in its first cycle in 2003 as the Creative Director. For nine years, Manuel featured on every cycle of the show, becoming one of the biggest shows in the United States during this period. After 18 seasons with the show, Nigel Barker and J. Alexander didn't return for the 19th cycle as their contracts were not renewed. Following the announcement, Manuel decided to leave the show. The controversial move by Tyra Banks led to a media frenzy around Manuel and the show. The radical personnel change didn't work and the show was cancelled three years later, being renewed on December 12, 2016 on VH1.

Manuel was the host and lead judge of the second and third cycles of Canada's Next Top Model, a spin-off to ANTM. He also made a cameo appearance in Degrassi Takes Manhattan, as well as playing himself in an episode of the comedy-drama television series Being Erica.

In 2011, Manuel released a clothing line for Sears Canada by the name of Attitude. In 2014, Manuel launched Jay Manuel Beauty, a prestige line of cosmetics based on a new Filter Finish Collection technology. Manuel was announced as a judge for the Miss Universe 2017 beauty pageant in early 2017. He was one of the six final judges who crowned Demi-Leigh Nel-Peters as Miss Universe 2017 at the event in Las Vegas, Nevada.

In May 2020, Manuel and his America's Next Top Model colleague, Miss J. Alexander, began a weekly Instagram Live series, later syndicated to Facebook and YouTube, based on their experiences working on the show.

Personal life 
Jay is openly gay. Although he is somewhat private about his romantic life, he regularly advocates for LGBTQ rights. In 2011, he created an "It Gets Better" video to empower LGBTQ  youth.

Beauty & clothing collections
In 2011, Manuel released a women's clothing line for Sears Canada, called Attitude Jay Manuel.

Manuel's beauty range was launched with the support of supermodel-turned-entrepreneur, Iman, in 2015 and distributed by her company Impala Inc. According to an interview in Essence magazine, Manuel and Iman met during the 1990s when he was recommended to do Iman's makeup for a cover shoot.

Jay Manuel Beauty launched in 2014 and the collection consists of a range of products aimed to create a high definition finish, aimed at the younger generation. In numerous interviews Manuel has stated that he wanted to introduce products that gave an Instagram filter finish, without the need for a filter. In March 2015 Jay Manuel beauty was launched on HSN. In July 2016, it was announced that the beauty range would debut on the UK's QVC shopping channel in September of that year.

Retail
In 2017, Manuel announced that he was moving into the retail sector with a range of beauty stores. The move was announced along with an exclusive partnership with Simon and its shopping centers. Manuel stated in an interview that they were to open their first brick and mortar location at Roosevelt Field Mall.

Instead of going down the traditional makeup route of signing a partnership with a department store or a well-known retailer like Sephora, Jay Manuel Beauty would operate physical stores. They would be known as the "Jay Manuel Beauty Retail Experience." This was the first time the brand was available at a physical location. Previously all the Jay Manuel Beauty products had been available for purchase via the Home Shopping Network and QVC only.

The first location opened November 16, Garden City, NY, with more Simon-based locations to open during 2018. Women's Wear Daily estimated that the success of the brand could lead to revenues of $1 million from this store's first year. The concept behind each of the stores was to improve the experience of the shopper. This would be done through a variety of techniques, including technology drives to improve customer experience.

Philanthropy
Manuel serves as a Smile Ambassador for Operation Smile and is actively involved with Dress for Success.

He has hosted the GLAAD Media Awards and also hosted Fashion Cares in Toronto, which benefits AIDS research. Manuel also hosted the American Image Awards, benefitting the Boys and Girls Clubs of America.

Filmography

 Live Broadcast of the Wedding of Prince Harry and Meghan Markle for BBC / Britbox (2018)
 Miss Universe 2017 (2017)
 Fashion News Live (Vintage) (2016-2017)
 Entertainment Tonight (2016)
 Fashion News Live (2006-2016)
 Patti LaBelle's Place (2016)
 The Wendy Williams Show (2011, 2015)
 The Meredith Vieira Show (2015)
 Fashion Rocks (2014)
 NBC’s Today Show (2014)
 FNL's Flashback Friday (2014)
 CBS This Morning (2013)
 CTV's Live Oscar Red Carpet (2013)
 The View (2013)
 NBC's Open House (2013)
 America's Next Top Model (2003-2012)
 CTV's The Marilyn Denis Show (2011, 2012)
 Access Hollywood (2010, 2011)
 Alexis Joy VIP Access (2011)
 The Nate Berkus Show (2011)
 Fashion Police (2006 - 2010)
 CNN The Joy Behar Show (2010)
 Degrassi Takes Manhattan (2010)
 Being Erica (2010)
 Project Runway (2010)
 The Tyra Banks Show (2007-2010)
 Teenage Paparazzo (2010)
 MTV’s When I Was 17 (2010)
 Canada's Next Top Model (2006-2009)
 Style Her Famous (2006-2009)
 E! Live from the Red Carpet (2006-2009)
 MTV's 106 & Park (2009)
 Chelsea Lately (2009)
 Giuliana and Bill (2009)
 Operation Fabulous (2009)
 Loose Women (2008)
 Live! with Kelly (2008)
 Paula's Party (2008)
 GLAAD Media Awards (2007)
 Peep: A Fashion Cares Special (2007)
 Much Music Video Music Awards (2006, 2007)
 Dress My Nest (2007)
 E! True Hollywood Story (2005, 2006)
 I Love the '80s 3-D (2005)
 Exposed: 25 Most Notorious Moments of Fashion Week (2005)
 Eve (2005)

References

External links 

 

1972 births
Living people
American emigrants to Canada
Artists from Illinois
Artists from Toronto
Canadian adoptees
Canadian male models
Canadian make-up artists
Canadian photographers
Canadian expatriates in the United States
Canadian people of Italian descent
Canadian people of Czech descent
Canadian people of Dutch descent
Canadian people of Malaysian descent
Canadian people of South African descent
People from Springfield, Illinois
Canadian LGBT broadcasters
LGBT people from Illinois
York University alumni